Lake Alan Henry is a reservoir situated in the upper Brazos River Basin in the United States. Created by the construction of the John T. Montford Dam in 1993, it is operated and used as a future tertiary water supply by the city of Lubbock, Texas and serves as a recreational spot for the region of West Texas.

Geography 
Lake Alan Henry is located on the Double Mountain Fork Brazos River in West Texas. Its elevation is  lower than the city of Lubbock. Lake water levels fluctuate moderately between two and four feet per year. Vegetation of the lake mainly consists of flooded trees.

Operating at full capacity, Lake Alan Henry could potentially contain over 40 billion gallons of water.

Fish populations
Lake Alan Henry has been stocked with several different populations of fish in order to encourage recreational and fishing activities. Stocking of the lake began in 1993 with adult shads and gizzards. Between 1993 and 1994, Lake Alan Henry was stocked with largemouth bass, white crappie, smallmouth bass, channel catfish, and other assorted fish by the Texas Parks and Wildlife Department. Currently, a consumption advisory is in place for certain species of fish found in the lake due to concerns of high levels of mercury.

History 
In the 1960s, the city of Lubbock moved forward with plans to create another water source for its growing population, and after years of soil studies and engineering research, the current location of the John T. Montford Dam was chosen as the closest and most suitable area for the structure and subsequent reservoir. After an application was approved by the Army Corps of Engineers, design work on the dam began in the 1980s. Construction started in 1991, and after two years, the dam was completed and began operation in 1993. The dam was named in honor of Senator John Thomas Montford for his efforts in legislation concerning the reservoir; likewise, Lake Alan Henry was named for a former mayor of Lubbock.

In 1994, as the reservoir began to fill, a water sampling program was created by Lubbock city officials in order to establish baseline water quality data. This would have a predicted maximum yield of 23 million gallons of water per day for Lubbock.

Today, the lake is used primarily as a recreational spot for the surrounding areas; fishing, water skiing, hunting, and other outdoor activities (including hiking and camping) are the main draw for visitors to the lake.

See also

Clear Fork Brazos River
North Fork Double Mountain Fork Brazos River
Salt Fork Brazos River
White River (Texas)

References

External links 
Texas Parks and Wildlife: Lake Alan Henry
Lake Alan Henry Water Levels
Lake Alan Henry Facebook Page

Dams in Texas
Alan Henry
Alan Henry